Citizens Utilities Rural Company, Inc. is a telephone operating company of Frontier Communications serving customers in Mohave County, Arizona. It was established in 1962. It is separate from Citizens Telecommunications Company of the White Mountains and the Navajo Communications Company. W. B. Foshay Company, a predecessor of Frontier, bought California & Nevada Telephone of Kingman in 1929.

References

Frontier Communications
Telecommunications companies established in 1962
Communications in Arizona
Telecommunications companies of the United States
1962 establishments in Arizona
American companies established in 1962